Eucalyptus brachycalyx, commonly known as gilja or Chindoo mallee, is a small tree or a mallee that is endemic to southern Australia.

Description
It has grey or grey-brown rough, shortly fibrous bark that is persistent on the trunk and larger branches. The upper bark is smooth, white to grey or pinkish above. Flowering occurs between January and April or between October and December and the flowers are white.

Taxonomy
Eucalyptus brachycalyx was first formally described by the botanist William Blakely and the description was published in his book Key Eucalypts. The specific epithet (brachycalyx) is from the Greek brachys meaning "short" and calyx meaning "cup" or "calyx", referring to the small buds.

Distribution
Gilja is found on sand dunes and limestone plains along the south coast in the Goldfields-Esperance region extending from the Fitzgerald River National Park in the west to the South Australian border. In South Australia it is found along the southern coast from the eastern edge of the Nullarbor Plain extending through the Eyre Peninsula, Yorke Peninsula and Fleurieu Peninsula along the south coast extending north into the Flinders Ranges and Gawler Range.

See also

List of Eucalyptus species

References

brachycalyx
Endemic flora of Western Australia
Mallees (habit)
Myrtales of Australia
Eucalypts of Western Australia
Plants described in 1934
Flora of South Australia
Taxa named by William Blakely